The Molonglo electorate was one of the three electorates for the unicameral 17-member Australian Capital Territory Legislative Assembly between 1995 and 2016. It had seven seats, and was the largest of the three electorates in terms of population.

History
Molonglo  was created in 1995, when the three-electorate, Hare-Clark electoral system was first introduced for the Australian Capital Territory (ACT). Prior to 1995, a multi-member single constituency existed for the whole of the ACT. The name "Molonglo" is derived from an Aboriginal word meaning "like the sound of thunder". It is the name of the river that flows through the central electorate, which was dammed to form Lake Burley Griffin, one of the focal points of Canberra and of the central electorate.

Location 
The Molonglo electorate consisted of the town centres of North Canberra, South Canberra, Weston Creek, and Woden (except for the suburbs of Chifley, Pearce and Torrens), and Gungahlin (except for the suburb of Nicholls). It also includes the parts of the ACT to the north and east of Canberra. Its western boundary was the Murrumbidgee River.

Molonglo was abolished in 2016, with its constituents transferred between each of three new electorates: Kurrajong, and parts of Murrumbidgee and Yerrabi.

Members 

1 Rosemary Follett (Labor) resigned on 12 December 1996. Simon Corbell (Labor) was elected as her replacement on a countback and was sworn in on 18 February 1997.
2 Terry Connolly (Labor) resigned on 19 February 1996. Marion Reilly (Labor) was elected as his replacement on a countback and was sworn in on 26 March 1996.
3 Kate Carnell (Liberal) resigned on 17 October 2000. Jacqui Burke (Liberal) was elected as her replacement on a countback and sworn in on 13 February 2001.
4 Gary Humphries (Liberal) resigned on 25 November 2002 to take up the position in the Australian Senate that had been vacated by Margaret Reid. Jacqui Burke (Liberal) was elected as his replacement on a countback and sworn in on 18 February 2003.
5 Helen Cross resigned from the Liberal Party on 23 September 2003 and remained in the Assembly as an independent.
6 Ted Quinlan (Labor) resigned on 21 March 2006. Andrew Barr (Labor) was elected as his replacement on a countback on 3 April 2006.
7 Richard Mulcahy was expelled from the Liberal Party Room and subsequently resigned from the Liberal Party on 10 December 2007. Mulcahy indicated he would continue to sit as an Independent.
8 Katy Gallagher resigned from the ACT Legislative Assembly on 23 December 2014 to take up a position in the Australian Senate. Meegan Fitzharris was elected as her replacement on a countback on 15 January 2015.

See also
 Australian Capital Territory Electoral Commission
 Australian Capital Territory Legislative Assembly
 Brindabella electorate
 Ginninderra electorate

External links
 Australian Capital Territory Electoral Commission

References

Former electorates of the Australian Capital Territory
Constituencies disestablished in 2016